The Order of the Two Niles or El-Neelain Order is a state decoration of Sudan established on 16 November 1961 during Ibrahim Abboud's military government. It is awarded for services to the state in the military and civil service. The Order of the Two Niles  - White and Blue Niles - is Sudan's second-highest honour after the Order of the Republic. The order is given to Sudanese and foreigners, civilians and military, who provided great services to the state. The order has five classes.

Classes

Insignia 
The star, sash, and badge make up the First Class insignia. The star has ten points and is covered in gold. A ten-ended star is created by superimposing two five-pointed stars with truncated rays on top of one another. The surfaces of the stars are covered with vertical and, consequently, horizontal rays. The star consists of four layers and is particularly huge (102 mm) and heavy (8 1⁄2 ozs). A 40 mm white medallion sits in the middle with the inscription in dark blue: "El Nilein ", or "The Two Niles" in Arabic calligraphy. The gold medallion is attached to the ribbon by means of a transition element in the form of a rhinoceros pendant. Rhinoceros was the Republic of Sudan emblem until it became the Democratic Republic of Sudan and changed the emblem in 1985 to a secretarybird. The ribbon is Royal blue moiré with two 5 mm white stripes toward each edge and is 51 mm wide. The badge is of the same pattern but smaller, measuring 58 mm across.

Class II consists of the star and a neck badge, Class III consists of a neck badge, and Class IV and V consist of breast badges. The insignia is made by Garrard & Co (London, England), Eng Leong Medallic Industries and Bichay (Cairo, Egypt).

Notable recipients

Class I: Grand Cross 

 Jean-Bédel Bokassa
 Saleh Abdullah Kamel
 Koča Popović
 Norman Jackson
 Adel Abdalaziz Al-Rshoud
 1979 Ahmed Mohamed El Hassan
 1988 Akef El-Maghraby
 1999 Abdul Rahman Al-Sumait
 2000 Jacques Diouf
 2001 Amr Moussa
 2002 Stefan Jakobielski
 2009 Essa Abdulla Al Basha Al Noaimi
 2013 Suleiman Jasir Al-Herbish
 2015 Hassan Ahmed Al Shehhi
 2015 OPEC Fund for International Development
 2016 Ghaith bin Moubarak Al-Kuwari
 2016 Taleb Rifai
 2016 Mohammed Matar Salem Al Kaabi
 2016 Abdalrhaman Salih El-Benian
 2017 Ghanem bin Shaheen Al-Ghanim
 2017 Tareq bin Mosa la Zedjali
 2018 Marta Ruedas
2018 Osama Shaltout
2018 José Graziano da Silva
2020 Mian Dutt
2021 Al-Hussein Ould Sidi Abdullah
2021 Emmanuel Platman
2021 Ahmed Ali Bri
2021 Ravdendra Prasad Jaswal
2022 Alberto Ucelay
2022 Abdul-Rahman bin Ali Al-Kubaisi
2022 
2022 Hossam Issa
2022 Bassam Al-Qabandi
2022 Ma Xinmin
2022 Patricia Maria Oliveira
2023 
2023 Lee Sang-Jeong

Class II: Grand Officer 

 1985 Bob Geldof
 2002 
 2004 Ahmed H. Zewail
 2006 William Y. Adams
 2012 Sabah Al-Khalid Al-Sabah
 2019 Ibrahim Osman El-Amir
 2023 David Beasley

Class III: Commander 

 Arthur Young
 Jamal al-Faisal
 Kamil Idris
 1972 Abdalah Grosh

Unknown class 

 Abdel Halim Mohamed
 Pope Shenouda III of Alexandria
 Sarabamon
 1965 Anthony Derrick Parsons
 1972 Burgess Carr
 1973 Thomas Jamieson
 1974 Faisal bin Sultan Al Qassimi
 1980 James Rodgers Allen
 1984 Clive Kelday Smith
 1988 Ahmad Fathi Sorour
 1989 Mohamed Hamad Satti
 1990 Muhammed Saleh Abdul-Wahab
 2001 Hosny El-Lakany
 2001 Salim Ahmed Salim

 2004 Peter Lewis Shinnie
 2004 Ergon agathon
 2005 Sepp Blatter
 2005 Abdulaziz bin Ahmed Al Saud
 2007 Raymond Stewart
 2009 Rodolphe Adada
 2016 Bashir Hassan Bashir
 2017 Samora Yunis
 2017 Abdillahi Omar Bouh
 2017 Mohammad Al-Khodher
 2018 Rashid Abdullah Al Nuaimi

References 

Orders, decorations, and medals of Sudan
Awards established in 1961